Sofia (Greek: Σοφία or Σοφιά also Isle of Gaia) is an island of the Echinades, among the Ionian Islands group of Greece. , it had no resident population.

In June 2015 it was reported that Brad Pitt and Angelina Jolie were considering buying the  island for $4.7 million. It has planning permission for six villas.

It has since been bought by footballer Lionel Messi.

References

External links
Sofia on GTP Travel Pages (in English and Greek)

Echinades
Islands of the Ionian Islands (region)
Islands of Greece
Landforms of Cephalonia